Universidad Central is a Quito Metro station. It was officially inaugurated opened on 21 December 2022 as part of the inaugural section of the system between Quitumbe and El Labrador. After the official inauguration, the system functions in the testing regime. The station is located between Pradera and El Ejido.

This is an underground station and has five exits. 

The station is located at the intersection of Avenida América and Calle Fray Antonio de Marchena. It is close to the campus of Central University of Ecuador, from which it takes its name.

On 23 January 2023, the first train with 600 passengers to whom invitations were extended, arrived to the station.

References

Quito Metro
2022 establishments in Ecuador
Railway stations opened in 2022